Barbari may refer to:

 Barbari, Latin for Barbarians
 Barbari (AMC Area), Dibrugarh, Assam, India
 Barbari bread
 Barbari Goat
 Barbari Roma Nord, an American football team from Rome
 Jacopo de' Barbari, Italian painter and printmaker

See also
 Barbary (disambiguation)